The 1993–94 Biathlon World Cup was a multi-race tournament over a season of biathlon, organised by the International Biathlon Union. The season started on 9 December 1993 in Bad Gastein, Austria, and ended on 20 March 1994 in Canmore, Canada. It was the 17th season of the Biathlon World Cup.

Calendar
Below is the IBU World Cup calendar for the 1993–94 season.

 Results from the Olympic Games did not count toward the World Cup.
 The relays were technically unofficial races as they did not count towards anything in the World Cup.

World Cup Podium

Men

Women

Men's team

Women's team

Standings: Men

Overall 

Final standings after 12 races.

Individual 

Final standings after 6 races.

Sprint 

Final standings after 6 races.

Nation 

Final standings after 18 races.

Standings: Women

Overall 

Final standings after 12 races.

Individual 

Final standings after 6 races.

Sprint 

Final standings after 6 races.

Nation 

Final standings after 18 races.

Medal table

Achievements
Victory in this World Cup (all-time number of victories in parentheses)

Men
 , 3 (5) first places
 , 2 (3) first places
 , 1 (4) first place
 , 1 (3) first place
 , 1 (2) first place
 , 1 (1) first place
 , 1 (1) first place
 , 1 (1) first place
 , 1 (1) first place

Women
 , 4 (4) first places
 , 2 (3) first places
 , 2 (2) first places
 , 1 (3) first place
 , 1 (3) first place
 , 1 (1) first place
 , 1 (1) first place

Retirements
Following notable biathletes retired during or after the 1993–94 season:

External links
IBU official site

References

Biathlon World Cup
1993 in biathlon
1994 in biathlon